Asterivora nivescens is a species of moth in the family Choreutidae. It is endemic to New Zealand and has been observed in Nelson. This species inhabits native herbage on mountain sides. Adults of this species are on the wing in January.

Taxonomy 
This species was first described by Alfred Philpott in 1926, using specimens collected at Gordon's Pyramid, Mount Arthur, and named Simaethis nivescens. George Hudson discussed and illustrated this species in his 1928 publication The butterflies and moths of New Zealand. In 1979 J. S. Dugdale placed this species within the genus Asterivora. In 1988 Dugdale confirmed this placement. The male holotype specimen, collected at Mount Arthur, is held at the New Zealand Arthropod Collection.

Description 
Philpott described this species as follows:

Description
This species is endemic to New Zealand and has been observed in Nelson.

Habitat 
This species inhabits native herbage on mountainsides.

Behaviour 
Adults of this species are on the wing in January.

References

Asterivora
Moths of New Zealand
Endemic fauna of New Zealand
Moths described in 1926
Taxa named by Alfred Philpott
Endemic moths of New Zealand